Montia parvifolia is a species of flowering plant in the family Montiaceae known by the common names little-leaf miner's lettuce, small-leaved blinks and small-leaved montia. It is native to western North America from Alaska to California to Montana, where it grows in moist to wet areas in several types of mountain habitat.

Description
Montia parvifolia is a perennial herb growing erect to about 40 centimeters tall from a matted, branching caudex base. It spreads via leafy stolons with sprouting bulblets. The fleshy oval leaves are alternately arranged in a rosette and measure up to 6 centimeters in length. The flower stems (peduncles) arise basally from the leaf rosette, and the inflorescence at the tip of the stem bears 1 to 12 flowers each with five pink or white petals up to 1.5 centimeters long.

References

External links

Jepson Manual Treatment - Montia parvifolia'
Montia parvifolia - Photo gallery
 Flora North America Treatment

parvifolia
Flora of the Sierra Nevada (United States)
Flora of California
Flora of the Western United States
Flora without expected TNC conservation status